Rock Creek is an unincorporated community in Raleigh County, West Virginia, United States.

References

Unincorporated communities in Raleigh County, West Virginia
Unincorporated communities in West Virginia